The Knox Automobile Company was a manufacturer of automobiles in Springfield, Massachusetts, United States, between 1900 and 1914. Knox also built trucks and farm tractors until 1924. They are notable for building the very first modern fire engine in 1905.

History
Harry Austin Knox built three experimental gasoline cars at Overman Wheel Company between 1895 and 1898. He left Overman when they decided to build a steam car.  Knox joined with his former employer, Elihu H. Cutler of the Elektron Company to form the Knox Automobile Company in Springfield Massachusetts in 1900. The Waltham Watch Company factory was purchased and Knox built 15 cars in their first year.

The Knox Model A was a three-wheel runabout with a 5-hp one-cylinder air-cooled engine. In 1902 a four-wheel runabout and a 8-hp two-cylinder engine joined the model line-up. Early cars were called Knoxmobile with the Waterless Knox being used from 1903. A slogan used was "The Car That Never Drinks".  In some models, passengers rode up front over the front axle while the driver and another passenger sat in the back over the engine.

The "Old Porcupine" engine 
The flat-mounted single-cylinder engine was air-cooled. Rather than flanges to improve the efficiency of cooling, 1,750 threaded 3/16 inch (5mm) diameter rods were screwed into the cylinder casing as projecting studs, which led to the engine sometimes being referred to as "Old Porcupine". A 2-speed planetary transmission was fitted. This engine was situated at the center of the car and produced 8 hp (6 kW). It was also called a "hedgehog". The one-cylinder engine was used until 1905. In 1902 a two-cylinder version was added that was used up to 1907.

Growth
Knox pricing for the one-cylinder and two-cylinder models went for a low price in 1900 of $750, to medium-priced by 1904.  A 1904 Knox Tuxedo Touring model, equipped with a straight-twin engine producing 16 hp (11.9 kW), was priced at $2,200, .

In late 1904 Harry Knox left the company over a disagreement on policy with Elihu Cutler. Harry Knox set-up a new business across town to build the Atlas air-cooled car.

In 1906 Knox Automobile Company introduced the Model G, a 40-hp air-cooled four-cylinder engine on a 112-inch wheelbase. With a limousine body priced at $5,000,  Knox had entered the luxury car market.  The two-cylinder models were phased out in 1907 and all Knox's became mid-priced to high-priced cars. Knox progressively improved their models, moving the engine from under the seat to up front under a bonnet and going from chain-driven to shaft-drive.

In 1908 a water-cooled four-cylinder engine was introduced and customers could choose air-cooled or pay $100 more for water-cooled models. A six-cylinder engine became available in 1910 and all Knox's became water-cooled. Only luxury-priced Knox's were offered after 1910.

Racing 
The Knox was raced by Billy Bourque in the 1909 AAA Championship Car race at the Indianapolis Motor Speedway. In 1910 a Knox was driven by Fred Belcher in the Vanderbilt Cup race.

Fate 
By 1912 Knox sales were slipping and a receiver was called in. The last Knox automobiles were built in 1914 and Knox was declared bankrupt in 1915.  Knox reorganized as the Knox Motors Corporation and continued build tractors and trucks until 1924. 

Afterwards Harry Knox moved on to design tanks for the US Army Ordnance Department; his T1 Light Tank wasn't adopted, but his Vertical volute spring suspension and his track design were used on almost all American tanks of the WWII, and he designed its replacement HVSS, which served until 1980s in some countries, as well.

Gallery

Knox Models

Knox Production

References

See also
 Brass Era car
 List of defunct United States automobile manufacturers
 Knox automobiles at ConceptCarz

Defunct motor vehicle manufacturers of the United States
Defunct manufacturing companies based in Massachusetts
Luxury motor vehicle manufacturers
Brass Era vehicles
Veteran vehicles
1900s cars
1910s cars
History of Springfield, Massachusetts
Manufacturing companies based in Springfield, Massachusetts
American companies established in 1900
Vehicle manufacturing companies established in 1900
Vehicle manufacturing companies disestablished in 1924
1900 establishments in Massachusetts
1924 disestablishments in Massachusetts
Motor vehicle manufacturers based in Massachusetts
American companies disestablished in 1924
Cars introduced in 1900